Antônio Jorge Cecílio Sobrinho, better known as Toninho Cecílio (born 27 May 1967), is a Brazilian professional football coach and former player who played as a central defender. He is the current director of football of Portuguesa.

Toninho Cecílio is one of the best known former players and current coaches in Brazil, having played for the Brazil national team in 1990 and captaining Palmeiras for many years.  Toninho Cecilio was head of the Brazilian players union and played and won awards and titles in the Japanese A-League.  Between 2007 and 2010 Toninho Cecilio returned to Palmeiras as the general manager.

Club statistics

Honours

Player 
Cerezo Osaka
 Japan Football League: 1994

Manager 
Santo André
 Campeonato Paulista Série A2: 2016

References

External links

Profile at Vitória's website (Portuguese)
Toninho moves to Vitória from Prduente (Portuguese)
Toninho is introduced as manager of Vitória (Portuguese)

1967 births
Living people
Association football defenders
Footballers from São Paulo (state)
Brazilian footballers
Brazilian football managers
Brazilian expatriate footballers
Expatriate footballers in Japan
Campeonato Brasileiro Série A players
J1 League players
Japan Football League (1992–1998) players
Campeonato Brasileiro Série A managers
Campeonato Brasileiro Série B managers
Sociedade Esportiva Palmeiras players
Botafogo de Futebol e Regatas players
Cruzeiro Esporte Clube players
Cerezo Osaka players
Coritiba Foot Ball Club players
São José Esporte Clube players
União São João Esporte Clube players
Associação Atlética Portuguesa (Santos) players
Paulista Futebol Clube players
Esporte Clube Santo André players
Guaratinguetá Futebol managers
Grêmio Barueri Futebol managers
Esporte Clube Vitória managers
Associação Desportiva São Caetano managers
Avaí FC managers
Paraná Clube managers
Comercial Futebol Clube (Ribeirão Preto) managers
Criciúma Esporte Clube managers
Esporte Clube XV de Novembro (Piracicaba) managers
ABC Futebol Clube managers
Mogi Mirim Esporte Clube managers
Esporte Clube Santo André managers
Clube Atlético Bragantino managers
Associação Atlética Anapolina managers
Anápolis Futebol Clube managers
Esporte Clube Água Santa managers
Esporte Clube Taubaté managers
People from Avaré